Saccharibacteria, formerly known as TM7,
is a major bacterial lineage. It was discovered through 16S rRNA sequencing .   

TM7x from the human oral cavity was cultivated and revealed that TM7x is an extremely small coccus (200-300 nm) and has a distinctive lifestyle not previously observed in human-associated microbes. It is an obligate epibiont of various hosts, including Actinomyces odontolyticus strain (XH001) yet also has a parasitic phase thereby killing its host. The full genome sequence revealed a highly reduced genome (705kB)  and a complete lack of amino acid biosynthetic capacity. An axenic culture of TM7 from the oral cavity was reported in 2014 but no sequence or culture was made available.

It has been found in several environments since such as from activated sludges, water treatment plant sludge rainforest soil, human saliva, in association with sponges, cockroaches, gold mines, acetate-amended aquifer sediment, and other environments (bar thermophilic), making it an abundant and widespread phylum. Recently, TM7 rDNA and whole-cells were detected in activated sludge with >99.7% identity to a human skin TM7 and 98.6% identity to the human oral TM7a, suggesting metabolically active TM7 isolates in environmental sites may serve as model organisms to investigate the role TM7 species play in human health.

Properties
TM7 specific FISH probes identified species from a bioreactor sludge revealed the presence of a gram-positive cell envelopes and several morphotypes: a sheathed filament (abundant), a rod occurring in short chains, a thick filament and cocci; the former may be the cause of Eikelboom type 0041 (bulking problems of activated sludges).
The majority of bacterial phyla are Gram-negative diderms, whereas only the Bacillota, the Actinomycetota and Chloroflexota are monoderms.

Using a polycarbonate membrane as a growth support and soil extract as the substrate, microcolonies of this clade were grown consisting of long filamentous rods up to 15 μm long with less than 50 cells or short rods with several hundred cells per colony, after 10 days incubation.

Thanks to a microfluidic chip allowing the isolation and amplification of the genome of a single cell, the genome of 3 long filament morphology cells with identical 16S rRNA were sequenced to create a draft sequence of the genome confirming some previously ascertained properties, elucidating some of its metabolic capabilities, revealing novel genes and hinting to potential pathogenic abilities.

Over 50 different phylotypes have been identified and it has a relatively modest intradivision 16S rDNA sequence divergence of 17%, which ranges from 13 to 33%. An interactive phylogenetic tree of TM7, built using jsPhyloSVG, allows for quick access to GenBank sequences and distance matrix calculations between tree branches.

Stable-isotope probing studies have found that some members of this phylum can degrade toluene.

Taxonomy

The currently accepted taxonomy is based on the List of Prokaryotic names with Standing in Nomenclature (LPSN) and National Center for Biotechnology Information (NCBI)
 Class "Saccharimonadia" corrig. McLean et al. 2020 ["Nanoperiodontomorbia" corrig. McLean et al. 2020; "Nanosyncoccia" corrig. McLean et al. 2020]
 Order "Saccharimonadales" McLean et al. 2020 ["Nanogingivalales" corrig. McLean et al. 2020; "Nanoperiodontomorbales" corrig. McLean et al. 2020; "Nanosynbacterales" McLean et al. 2020; "Nanosyncoccales" McLean et al. 2020]
 "Ca. Chaera" corrig. Lemos et al. 2019
 "Ca. C. renei" corrig. Lemos et al. 2019
 "Ca. Minimicrobia" Ibrahim et al. 2021
 "Ca. M. naudis" Ibrahim et al. 2021
 "Ca. M. vallesae" Ibrahim et al. 2021
 "Ca. Mycosynbacter" Batinovic et al. 2021 (JR1)
 "Ca. M. amalyticus" Batinovic et al. 2021
 "Ca. Nanosynsaccharibacterium" corrig. McLean et al. 2020
 Family "Nanogingivalaceae" McLean et al. 2020
 "Ca. Nanogingivalis" McLean et al. 2020 (CMJM_G6_1_HOT_870; UMGS1907)
 "Ca. N. gingivitcus" McLean et al. 2020
 Family "Nanoperiodontomorbaceae" corrig. McLean et al. 2020
 "Ca. Nanoperiodontomorbus" corrig. McLean et al. 2020 (EAM_G5_1_HOT_356; UBA1103)
 "Ca. N. periodonticus" corrig. McLean et al. 2020
 Family "Nanosynbacteraceae" McLean et al. 2020
 "Ca. Nanosynbacter" McLean et al. 2020 (TM7x)
 "Ca. N. lyticus" McLean et al. 2020
 Family "Nanosyncoccaceae" McLean et al. 2020
 "Ca. Nanosyncoccus" McLean et al. 2020 (G3_2_Rum_HOT_351B; UBA2866)
 "Ca. N. alces" McLean et al. 2020
 "Ca. N. nanoralicus" McLean et al. 2020
 Family "Saccharimonadaceae" McLean et al. 2020
 "Ca. Saccharimonas" Albertsen et al. 2013
 "Ca. S. " Albertsen et al. 2013
 Family UBA1547
 "Ca. Microsaccharimonas" corrig. Lemos et al. 2019 (AMD02; UBA6175)
 "Ca. M. sossegonensis" corrig. Lemos et al. 2019

Phylogeny

See also
 List of bacterial orders
 List of bacteria genera

References

External links
 Ultra-Small, Parasitic Bacteria Found in Groundwater, Dogs, Cats — And You; on: SciTechDaily; July 21, 2020; source:  Forsyth Institute
 Jeffrey S. McLean, Batbileg Bor, Kristopher A. Kerns, Kelly Wrighton, Wenyuan Shi, Xuesong He, et al.: Acquisition and Adaptation of Ultra-small Parasitic Reduced Genome Bacteria to Mammalian Hosts; in: CellRep 32, 107939; July 21, 2020; doi:10.1016/j.celrep.2020.107939
 Jeffrey S. McLean, Batbileg Bor, Thao T. To, Quanhui Liu, Kristopher A. Kerns, Lindsey Solden, Kelly Wrighton, Xuesong He, Wenyuan Shi: Evidence of independent acquisition and adaption of ultra-small bacteria to human hosts across the highly diverse yet reduced genomes of the phylum Saccharibacteria; on: bioRxiv; February 02, 2018; doi:10.1101/258137 (PrePrint)

Bacteria
Bacteria phyla
Candidatus taxa